Mutt is a 2023 drama film directed, written and produced by Vuk Lungulov-Klotz in his feature directorial debut.

The film had its world premiere at the 2023 Sundance Film Festival on January 23, 2023.

Premise
In a day, Feña, a trans man, rekindles three old relationships after having lost touch since his gender transitioning, with his foreign father, his straight ex-boyfriend and his estranged younger half-sister.

Cast
Lío Mehiel as Feña, a trans man in his 20s
Cole Doman as John, Feña's straight ex-boyfriend
MiMi Ryder as Zoe, Feña's estranged younger half-sister
Alejandro Goic as Pablo, Feña's father
Sarah Herrman as Jenny, a young woman Feña meets in a night club and John's cousin
Jasai Chase Owens as Aidan
Jari Jones as Fiona, Feña's roommate

Production
During the Deadline Studio panel at Sundance Film Festival, Lungulov-Klotz revealed that he wrote the script of Mutt six years prior and recalled the experience as "trying to place all of his fears in the film". The principal photography began at the start of fall 2022.

Release
Mutt had its world premiere at the 2023 Sundance Film Festival, on January 23, 2023. At the premiere, the film screened with open captions after jury walkout due to a captioning malfunction three days prior. The film had its international premiere during the Generation 14plus program at the 73rd Berlin International Film Festival and won Special Mention award.

Reception
On review aggregator website Rotten Tomatoes, the film has an approval rating of 89% based on 18 reviews, with an average rating of 6.7/10. 

Leslie Felperin of The Hollywood Reporter deemed Mutt as "one of the best films about post-transition adjustment".

References

External links 

 

2023 directorial debut films
2023 drama films
Films about gender
Films about trans men
Films set in New York City
Slice of life films
2023 LGBT-related films
American drama films
American LGBT-related films
2020s American films